Beatriz Pellón Fernández-Fontecha (born 15 September 1960) is a Spanish former professional tennis and field hockey player.

As a tennis player, she won a silver medal in doubles at the 1979 Mediterranean Games, partnering with Mónica Álvarez de Mon. From 1977 to 1984, she appeared in 7 Federation Cup ties for Spain and won three of her nine rubbers.

One of her brothers is Olympic medalist Juan Pellón.

See also
List of Spain Fed Cup team representatives

References

External links
 
 

1960 births
Living people
Spanish female tennis players
Mediterranean Games silver medalists for Spain
Mediterranean Games medalists in tennis
Competitors at the 1979 Mediterranean Games
Sportspeople from Santander, Spain